Yevhen Oleksandrovych Adamtsevych (19 December 19041 January 1972) was a prominent blind Ukrainian bandurist.

Biography
Yevhen Oleksandrovych Adamtsevych was born in the village of Solonytsia on 1 January 1904, not far from the town of Lubny, in Poltava oblast. His mother was Maria Mykhailivna (née Bilan), the middle class daughter of a tailor whose five children were all educated at home.

Yevhen became blind at the age of two. He was educated at a school for the blind in Kyiv. He lived in Romny where from 1925 he was apprenticed to the kobzar , who taught him to play the bandura.

Adamtsevych began to perform as a soloist in 1927, where he led a group of bandurists. In 1927 he married Lidia Dmytrivna Paradis; her relatives did not approve of this marriage and were only reconciled years later. During the 1930s, he was a travelling kobzar. In 1939 he participated in the conference of kobzars which took place in Kyiv, and he participated in a 1940 conference on folk singers in Moscow. 

During the Second World War, Adamtsevych travelled around Ukraine, performing patriotic songs, including his own composition, the song Unwillingly. During the 1950s and 1960s, he and other bandurists gave concerts in Ukraine and Russia.

In October 1972, Adamtsevych and his wife moved to live with their daughter in the village of Kholmivka, Bakhchysaray District, Crimea. Three weeks later, he was hospitalized with acute pain caused by a stone in his gall bladder), but died during the early hours of 20 November whilst on the operating table.

Playing and singing style
Adamtsevych acted as a bearer of the national Ukrainian traditions of singing and playing the bandura, which he learned his repertoire directly through oral transmission. A characteristic feature of Adamtsevych's singing style was his ability to highlight syllables or words; the range of his voice covered two octaves. he was known for being able to easily memorize the music and lyrics of any songs that he listened to.

Personality
Adamtsevych's daughter recalled her father as being was energetic, cheerful, and neat. He did not have a haircut, but shaved his head "according to Kotovskyi". According to his daughter, "He did everything himself: he sawed and chopped firewood, repaired the house, built it, even roofed the house himself with iron, dug cellars and covered it with bricks." Adamtsevich attempted unsuccessfully to teach his daughter Tetyana to play the bandura.

Repertoire
Adamtsevych's repertoire included many historic Ukrainian folk songs, but lacked any authentic dumy (sung epic poems).  Yevshan-Zillia, the single epic work in his repertoire, was structured like a duma.

The march was played regularly by the Ukrainian State Orchestra of Ukrainian Folk Instruments in Kyiv. Other compositions include the songs "In Captivity" (1941), and "Thoughts about I.F. Fedka" (1966).

Notes

References

Sources
 

 

Bandurists
Kobzarstvo
People from Poltava Oblast
Ukrainian composers
1904 births
1972 deaths
Blind musicians
Soviet composers